State Road 111 (NM 111) is a state highway in the US state of New Mexico. NM 111's southern terminus is at U.S. Route 285 (US 285) north of Ojo Caliente, and the northern terminus is at County Road 450.

Major intersections

See also

References

111
Transportation in Taos County, New Mexico
Transportation in Rio Arriba County, New Mexico